The Little Mermaid II: Return to the Sea is a 2000 animated direct-to-video musical fantasy adventure film produced by Walt Disney Television Animation, and the second installment in The Little Mermaid trilogy. Directed by Jim Kammerud and Brian Smith, the story of the film takes place 12 years after the original, and focuses on Ariel and Eric's daughter Melody, a human princess who longs to swim in the ocean despite her parents' law that the sea is forbidden to her.

Many voice actors from the original film returned for the sequel, including Jodi Benson as Ariel, Kenneth Mars as King Triton, Samuel E. Wright as Sebastian, and Buddy Hackett as Scuttle in his final film role before his death in June 2003. Pat Carroll, who  voiced Ursula in the first film, returned as Ursula's sister Morgana, the sequel's new villain. Tara Charendoff joined the cast as Melody, Rob Paulsen replaced Christopher Daniel Barnes as Prince Eric and Kay E. Kuter voiced Grimsby replacing Ben Wright who died four months before the first film was released.

The film received largely negative reviews with criticism directed at the plot and lack of originality, though Melody's character, alongside Strong's acting has been praised. In 2008, Disney released a third film, The Little Mermaid: Ariel's Beginning, which is a prequel to the first film.

It was early released in April 17, 2000.

Plot
One year after they got married and Ursula's demise, Ariel and Eric celebrate the birth of their daughter Melody on a ship at sea. Ariel's father King Triton presents Melody with a magic locket. The party is interrupted by Ursula's sister Morgana, who threatens to have Melody fed to her pet tiger shark, Undertow, unless Triton surrenders his trident to her. Morgana then announces her plan to use the trident to avenge Ursula and take over the ocean. Ariel and Eric work together to foil Morgana's plan, and Triton shrinks Undertow to the size of a piranha. Morgana escapes, eluding the attempts of King Triton's forces to capture her and declaring that she will someday exact her revenge on both Ariel and Triton and avenge Ursula's death. Fearing Morgana and remembering Ursula, Ariel decides that, until Morgana is captured, they will have to withhold all knowledge of the sea world and her heritage from Melody in order to protect her. Triton tosses the locket into the ocean, and a massive wall is built to separate the royal castle from the sea. Triton assigns Sebastian to watch over Melody.

Twelve years later, Melody remains unaware of her mother's mermaid heritage and is forbidden from ever going into the sea. However, she has been sneaking out of the castle regularly to swim, and one day finds the locket. Seeing her name on the locket, Melody questions her mother about it, but Ariel confronts Melody and forbids her to go into the sea. Frustrated with her mother's refusal to answer her questions, Melody steals a small boat and sails away from home. Melody is discovered by Undertow, who leads her straight to Morgana. In desperation, Sebastian tells Ariel and Eric that Melody went out to the sea. Meanwhile, Melody meets Morgana, who reveals that Melody's background is marine, and uses the remains of Ursula's magic to transform Melody into a mermaid. Triton prepares search parties, and is convinced by Ariel and Eric to use his trident to transform Ariel back into a mermaid in order to help in the search for Melody. Ariel searches the sea for Melody, regretting not sharing her heritage with her, while Melody explores her newfound abilities as a mermaid, and has a strong feeling that she was meant to be part of the sea.

Melody visits Morgana to thank her, only for Morgana to tell Melody that the spell was only temporary, and that she can only make the spell permanent if Melody retrieves the trident from Triton, which Morgana claims he stole from her. Melody decides to get the trident, and during her search befriends Tip and Dash, a penguin and walrus duo who join her. Melody succeeds in stealing the trident, and returns to Morgana, but before Melody can hand the trident over to Morgana, Ariel arrives and pleads for Melody not to give Morgana the trident. Melody refuses to listen to Ariel, having been angered by Ariel's decision to lie to her, and gives Morgana the trident. With the trident in her power, Morgana reveals her true intentions, goes back on her deal, and traps Melody in a cave by sealing the entrance with a thick layer of ice, while also informing her that her time as a mermaid is about to expire. Melody then expresses her guilt for trusting Morgana. Soon afterward, Morgana's spell on Melody wears off, causing her to revert into a human and nearly drown. Tip and Dash manage to free her with unintentional help from Undertow (who was turned back to normal by Morgana) and drag her to the shore.

Morgana uses the trident's magic to lord over the ocean, rising to the surface to gloat and creates a giant ice structure. Scuttle, Triton, Sebastian, and Eric arrive, and a battle ensues against Morgana and her minions. Melody manages to grab the trident, impales one of Morgana's tentacles, and throws it back to Triton, who encases Morgana in a block of ice, which sinks underwater as her ice structure collapses, and a picture of her sister sinks as well. Melody reunites with her family and apologizes to Ariel for her actions, and Triton offers his granddaughter the choice of becoming a mermaid permanently. Instead, Melody uses the trident to destroy the wall separating her home from the sea, reuniting the humans and the merpeople.

Voice cast

 Jodi Benson as Ariel
 Tara Charendoff as Melody
 Samuel E. Wright as Sebastian
 Pat Carroll as Morgana
 Buddy Hackett as Scuttle (final film role)
 Kenneth Mars as King Triton
 Max Casella as Tip
 Stephen Furst as Dash
 Rob Paulsen as Eric
 Clancy Brown as Undertow
 Cam Clarke as Flounder
 René Auberjonois as Chef Louis
 Kay E. Kuter as Grimsby
 Edie McClurg as Carlotta
 Dee Bradley Baker as Cloak and Dagger
 Frank Welker as Max

Release

Home media
The film was released directly to video on September 19, 2000. It was released on May 7, 2001, in the UK. On November 6, 2006, the film was released in a bundle together with the original film in the Region 2 release. The original DVD release was later discontinued and a special edition DVD with a deleted song, "Gonna Get My Wish", and a new game was released on December 16, 2008. A package called The Little Mermaid Trilogy, which includes all three Little Mermaid films, was released on the same day. This film, along with The Little Mermaid: Ariel's Beginning, was released in a 2-Movie collection on DVD and Blu-ray on November 19, 2013.

Reception

Movie's response 

Review aggregator Rotten Tomatoes reports that 17% of 6 critics gave the film a positive review, and the average rating is 3.8/10. In 2011, Total Film ranked it as 27th among the 50 worst children's films ever made.

Melody's reception 

Unlike the film and even her mother Ariel, for whom the latter was generally mixed, Melody, the main character, was generally well received by both critics and Little Mermaid fans, who praised her emotional relationship with Ariel, character growth, likability, and Tara Strong's performance. In 2019, Screen Rant put her at #9 on Disney's Unofficial Princesses, Ranked.
Melody is one of Tara Strong's favorite characters to voice, as she was a big fan of the 1989 film growing up.

Home video sales 
The film was the tenth-most-successful direct-to-video release of 2000, with retail revenues of $121 million. The film sold  VHS and DVD units in 2000.

Soundtrack

The film's official soundtrack was released on September 19, 2000, and again on October 31, 2000, in a special edition double pack with the original film's soundtrack. Additionally, two limited-edition two-tracked CD samples were released as a promotion for the soundtrack.

 Note: *These tracks were originally recorded for the album Sebastian: Party Gras!.

The film's ending credits play a new recording of Part of Your World,  performed by country singer Chely Wright. Another version of the song, performed by Ann Marie Boskovich, was used in some international releases of the film.

Video game
The film was adapted into a 2D scrolling video game for PlayStation that released on September 25, 2000. It was developed by Blitz Games and published by THQ. It was later re-released for PlayStation 3, PlayStation Portable, and PlayStation Vita.

References

External links

 
 
 
 
 

2000 animated films
2000 direct-to-video films
2000s adventure films
2000s American animated films
American children's animated adventure films
American children's animated fantasy films
American children's animated musical films
American coming-of-age films
American sequel films
Australian animated feature films
Australian musical fantasy films
Canadian direct-to-video films
Canadian musical fantasy films
Canadian animated feature films
English-language Canadian films
Animated coming-of-age films
Direct-to-video sequel films
The Little Mermaid (franchise)
Disney direct-to-video animated films
DisneyToon Studios animated films
Films about witchcraft
Animated films about children
Films about princesses
Films about shapeshifting
Disney Television Animation films
Films directed by Jim Kammerud
2000 directorial debut films
Films based on The Little Mermaid
2000s children's animated films
Films set in castles
Films set in palaces
Films set in a fictional country
2000 films
Films about mother–daughter relationships
2000s English-language films
2000s Canadian films
Films about mermaids